Thomas Foulds Ellsworth (November 12, 1840 - August 29, 1911) was an American soldier who received the Medal of Honor for valor during the American Civil War.

Biography
Ellsworth served in the Union Army in the 55th Massachusetts Infantry. He received the Medal of Honor on November 18, 1895, for his actions at the Battle of Honey Hill.

Medal of Honor citation
Citation:

 The President of the United States of America, in the name of Congress, takes pleasure in presenting the Medal of Honor to Captain (Infantry) Thomas Foulds Ellsworth, United States Army, for extraordinary heroism on 30 November 1864, while serving with Company B, 55th Massachusetts Colored Infantry, in action at Honey Hill, South Carolina. Under a heavy fire Captain Ellsworth carried his wounded commanding officer from the field.

See also

List of American Civil War Medal of Honor recipients: A-F

References

External links
Military Times

1840 births
1911 deaths
Union Army officers
United States Army Medal of Honor recipients
People of Massachusetts in the American Civil War
American Civil War recipients of the Medal of Honor